Boys Will Be Girls is a 1937 British comedy film directed by Gilbert Pratt and starring Leslie Fuller, Nellie Wallace and Greta Gynt. The film was made by Fuller's own independent production company in the Rock Studios at Elstree. In order to gain his inheritance, a man has to give up drinking and smoking.

Cast
 Leslie Fuller as Bill Jenkins 
 Nellie Wallace as Bertha Luff 
 Greta Gynt as Roberta (credited as Greta Woxholt)
 Georgie Harris as Roscoe 
 Judy Kelly as Thelma 
 D.J. Williams as George Luff 
 Toni Edgar-Bruce as Mrs. Jenkins 
 Constance Godridge as Ernestine 
 Syd Crossley as Nolan 
 Syd Courtenay as Bookum

References

Bibliography
 Chibnall, Steve. Quota Quickies: The Birth of the British 'B' Film. British Film Institute, 2007.
 Low, Rachael. Filmmaking in 1930s Britain. George Allen & Unwin, 1985.
 Wood, Linda. British Films, 1927-1939. British Film Institute, 1986.

External links

1937 films
British comedy films
British black-and-white films
1937 comedy films
Films directed by Gilbert Pratt
Films shot at Rock Studios
1930s English-language films
1930s British films